Little Cataraqui Creek Conservation Area is a  conservation area located north of the city of Kingston, Ontario, Canada, and is managed by the Cataraqui Region Conservation Authority.

The Little Cataraqui Creek flows through the area and a reservoir has been built for water control and wildlife management purposes. It boasts an outdoor centre and houses the headquarters of the Cataraqui Region Conservation Authority.  In the winter the conservation area is popular for ice skating, cross country skiing, snowshoeing, and chickadee feeding. In the summer, several day camps operate, and popular activities are canoeing, kayaking and bird watching. Composed of pond, marsh, field, and forest habitats, a diverse collection of animal and plant species can be found.

References

External links
 Little Cataraqui Creek Conservation Area

Conservation areas in Ontario
Parks in Kingston, Ontario